Defensa Interior (DI) was an militant anarchist organisation, founded in September 1961 by the congress of the Movimiento Libertario Español (Spanish Libertarian Movement). It was disbanded by their 1965 congress.

The aim of DI was to fight against Francoist Spain.

Defensa Interior was a precursor to later anarchist groups such as the First of May Group, GARI, and the Angry Brigade .

See also
Anarchism in Spain
Stuart Christie

Anarchist organisations in Spain
Political parties established in 1961
1965 disestablishments in Spain
Anti-Francoism
1961 establishments in Spain
Left-wing militant groups in Spain
Defunct anarchist militant groups